The Metropolitan League ran for twenty-two seasons between 1949–50 and 1970–71.

1949–50
The league was composed of:
Callender Athletic
Chingford Town reserves (from the London League Premier Division)
Chipperfield (from the Herts County League Division One)
Dagenham
Dickinsons (from the Herts County League Division One)
Headington United reserves
Hammersmith United
Hove (from the Sussex County League)
St Neots & District (from the South Midlands League Premier Division)
Twickenham

1950–51
Eight new clubs joined the league in its second season; 
Brighton & Hove Albion 'A'
Croydon Rovers
Dunstable Town
Hastings United reserves (from the London League Premier Division)
Leatherhead (from the Surrey Senior League)
Luton Town 'A'
Vickers Armstrong
Windsor & Eton (from the Corinthian League)

1951–52
Five new clubs joined the league in its third season;
Horsham (from the Sussex County League) 
Millwall 'A'
Skyways
Tonbridge reserves (from the London League Premier Division)
Tottenham Hotspur 'A' (from the Eastern Counties League, although they also continued to play in the ECL for another three seasons)

1952–53
Four new clubs joined the league for its fourth season;
Haywards Heath (from the Sussex County League)
Newbury Town
Southwick (from the Sussex County League)
West Ham United 'A' (from the Eastern Counties League, although they also continued to play in the ECL for another four season)

1953–54
Four new clubs joined the league prior to the start of the 1953–54 season;
Chelsea 'A' (from the Eastern Counties League)
Dartford reserves (from the London League Premier Division)
Guildford City reserves (from the London League Premier Division)
Gravesend & Northfleet reserves (from the London League Premier Division)

1954–55
One new club joined the league prior to the start of the 1954–55 season;
Wokingham Town

1955–56
One new club joined the league prior to the start of the 1955–56 season;
Bedford Town reserves (from the United Counties League Division One)

1956–57
Two new clubs joined the league prior to the start of the 1956–57 season;
Crawley (from the Sussex County League Division Two)
Eastbourne United (from the Sussex County League Division One)

1957–58
Two new clubs joined for the 1957–58 season;
Didcot Town (from the Hellenic League Premier Division)
Fulham 'A'

1958–59
One new club joined the league for the 1958–59 season;
Arsenal 'A'

1959–60
One new club joined the league for the 1959–60 season;
Canterbury City (from the Kent League Division One)

1960–61
Two new clubs joined the league for the 1960–61 season;
Metropolitan Police (from the Spartan League)
St Neots Town (from the Central Alliance)

1961–62
Three new clubs joined the league for the 1961–62 season;
Bexleyheath & Welling reserves
Rainham Town (from the Delphian League)
Woodford Town (from the Delphian League)

1962–63
Two new clubs joined the league for the 1962–63 season;
Gravesend & Northfleet reserves
Kettering Town reserves (from the United Counties League Division One)

1963–64
A second division was added for the 1963–64 season, with all the clubs in the division new apart from Gravesend & Northfleet reserves. Six new clubs joined Division One;
Cambridge City reserves (from the Eastern Counties League)
Charlton Athletic 'A'
Chelmsford City reserves (from the Eastern Counties League)
Crawley Town reserves
Romford reserves (from the Eastern Counties League)
Tottenham Hotspur 'A' (from the Eastern Counties League)

1964–65
Division Two was disbanded after a single season, although four of its clubs stayed in the league and moved up to the single division. An additional four new clubs joined the league for the 1964–65 season;
Bury Town (from the Eastern Counties League)
Chatham Town (from the Aetolian League)
Luton Town 'A'
Wimbledon reserves

1965–66
Five new clubs joined the league for the 1965–66 season;
Barnet reserves
Brentwood Town (from the Athenian League Division Two), changed their name from Brentwood & Warley
Dunstable Town reserves (from the Hellenic League Division One)
Hatfield Town (from the Greater London League A Section)
Sheppey United (from the Greater London League B Section)

1966–67
Three new clubs joined the league for the 1966–67 season;
Cray Wanderers (from the Greater London League Premier Division)
Crittall Athletic  (from the Greater London League Premier Division)
Hillingdon Borough reserves (from the Hellenic League Premier Division)

1967–68
One new club joined the league for the 1967–68 season;
Brentwood Town reserves

1968–69
Four new clubs joined the league for the 1968–69 season:
Bletchley Town (from the United Counties League Division One)
Romford reserves
Stevenage Athletic
Wellingborough Town (from the United Counties League Division One)

1969–70
Three new clubs joined the league for the start of the 1969–70 season;
Brentwood Town reserves (rejoined after a season's absence)
Epping Town (from the Greater London League Division One)
Oxford United 'A'

1970–71
Two new clubs joined the league for the start of the 1970–71 season;
Woodford Town (rejoined after three season's absence)
Chelmsford City reserves (rejoined after a season's absence)
At the end of the season four clubs moved up to the Southern League as it added a new second tier division, splitting the previous Division One into Division One North and Division One South.

References